Cueva Lucero is a cave and archeological site in the Guayabal barrio of the Juana Díaz municipality, in Puerto Rico. The cave includes more than 100 petroglyphs and pictographs "making it one of the best examples of aboriginal rock art in the Antilles." It has been known to archeologists since at least the early 1900s. Most of its images are zoomorphic. The site is known to locals including rock-climbers and spelunkers and there is some modern graffiti.

The cave was listed on the National Register of Historic Places in 2008.

Gallery
View from inside :

See also
National Register of Historic Places listings in Juana Díaz, Puerto Rico

References

External links
Summary sheet from the Puerto Rico State Historic Preservation Office 
, National Register of Historic Places cover documentation (redacted)

Juana Díaz, Puerto Rico
Archaeological sites on the National Register of Historic Places in Puerto Rico
Caves of Puerto Rico
Petroglyphs in Puerto Rico
Pre-Columbian archaeological sites
Caves containing pictograms